Ghassem Hashemi Nezhad or Ghasem Hasheminejad (September 24, 1940 – April 1, 2016) was a Persian Literary critic, writer, journalist, screenwriter, and mysticism. Nezhad was the author of the novel ‘Elephant in the Dark’. He is a critic and author who has worked for the Ayandegan newspaper.

References

External links
Iranica Online - Ghassem Hashemi Nezhad

Iranian journalists
Iranian male novelists
Iranian novelists
Iranian translators
People from Amol
1941 births
2016 deaths
20th-century translators
20th-century male writers
Iranian literary critics